Eight ships of the Royal Navy have been named HMS Royal George after various members of the House of Hanover. A ninth was renamed before being launched:

She was renamed HMS Victory in 1691, HMS Royal George in 1714 and HMS Victory again in 1715.
  was a 100-gun first rate launched in 1756. She served in the Seven Years' War and the American War of Independence and sank at Spithead in 1782.
  was a 20-gun sloop listed as serving on the Canadian lakes in 1776.
  was a 100-gun first rate launched in 1788 and broken up in 1822.
  was a 20-gun sloop launched in 1809. She served on the Canadian lakes in the War of 1812, was renamed HMS Niagara in 1814 and was sold in 1837.
  was a yacht launched in 1817 and broken up in 1905.
  was a 120-gun first rate launched in 1827, fitted with screw propulsion in 1853 and sold in 1875.
 HMS Royal George was to have been a battleship, but she was renamed  before she was launched in 1911.

See also

References
 

Royal Navy ship names